The canton of Chasseneuil-du-Poitou is an administrative division of the Vienne department, western France. It was created at the French canton reorganisation which came into effect in March 2015. Its seat is in Chasseneuil-du-Poitou.

It consists of the following communes:
 
Bignoux
Bonnes
La Chapelle-Moulière
Chasseneuil-du-Poitou
Jardres
Lavoux
Liniers
Montamisé
Pouillé
Saint-Julien-l'Ars
Savigny-Lévescault
Sèvres-Anxaumont
Tercé

References

Cantons of Vienne